Faro Castillo del Morro is a lighthouse located in Havana, Cuba. It was built in 1845 on the ramparts of the Castillo de los Tres Reyes Magos del Morro, an old fortress guarding the harbor of Havana. 

See also

List of buildings in Havana
 Havana Harbor
 List of lighthouses in Cuba

References

External links

Castillo del Morro
Buildings and structures in Havana
Transport in Havana
Lighthouses completed in 1845
19th-century architecture in Cuba